This is a list of adult non-fiction books that topped The New York Times Fiction Best Seller list in 1979.

See also

 1979 in literature
 The New York Times Fiction Best Sellers of 1979
 Lists of The New York Times Fiction Best Sellers
 Publishers Weekly list of bestselling novels in the United States in the 1970s

References

1979
.
1979 in the United States